The Army List is a list (or more accurately seven series of lists) of serving regular, militia or territorial British Army officers, kept in one form or another, since 1702.

Manuscript lists of army officers were kept from 1702 to 1752, the first official list being published in 1740.

Regular army

 Annual Army Lists, 1754–1879 (WO 65)
 Quarterly Army Lists (First Series), 1879–1922
 Half-Yearly Army Lists, 1923 – February 1950 (from 1947, annual, despite the name)
 Modern Army Lists, 1951–ongoing
 Part 1; serving officers.
 Part 2; retired officers, as of 2011 four-yearly
 Part 3; the Gradation List, a short biography of officers, a restricted publication  not generally available.

Other lists
 Monthly Army Lists, 1798 – June 1940. Officers of colonial, militia and territorial units are included.
 Quarterly Army Lists (Second Series), July 1940 – December 1950. These superseded the Monthly Army Lists, and, for the remainder of World War II were not published but produced as confidential documents, monthly or bi-monthly until December 1943 and quarterly until April 1947, then three times a year, April, August and December.
 Home Guard List, 1939–1945
 Militia Lists: various militia lists pertaining to the eighteenth and nineteenth centuries are extant.
 Hart's Army List, an unofficial list, produced between 1839 and 1915, containing details of war service which the official lists started covering only in 1881.

See also
 Crockford's Clerical Directory
 Navy List

References

Further reading and bibliography
 The army lists of the Roundheads and Cavaliers: containing the names of the officers in the Royal and Parliamentary armies of 1642, Edward Peacock (ed.) (1874)
 English army lists and commission registers, 1661–1714, Charles Dalton (ed.) (1892–1904)
 Henry George Hart, Hart's army list: the new army list exhibiting the rank, standing, and various services of every officer in the Army on full pay (1839–)
 William Spencer, Army service records of the First World War (seventh edition, 2006)

External links
 The 1740 Army List at Google Books
 War Office: Printed Annual Army Lists 1754–1879 (WO 65)—download for free
 Digitised copies of 'Quarterly army lists' from 1913 to 1919 and from 1940 to 1946 at National Library of Scotland
 Digitised copies of 'Half-yearly army lists' from 1938 to 1941 at National Library of Scotland
 British Army Lists (National Archives' Research Guide)
 Hart's Army List at the Internet Archive

Directories
British Army